A One Day International (ODI) is an international cricket match between two teams, each having ODI status, as determined by the International Cricket Council. The women's variant of the game is similar to the men's version, with minor modifications to umpiring and pitch requirements. The first women's ODI was played in 1973, between England and Australia. Due to the sporting boycott placed upon their country, South Africa women did not contest their first ODI until August 1997, playing Ireland in Belfast.

In total, South Africa women's team has played 227 ODIs. Mignon du Preez is the most capped player, having appeared in 154 ODIs and the leading run-scorer with 3,760 runs. Johmari Logtenberg's score of 153 not out against the Netherlands in 2007 is the highest score in women's ODI cricket by a South African Shabnim Ismail has claimed more ODI wickets than any other South African woman, having taken 191 and has the best return by a South African bowler, having claimed six wickets (6/10) in an innings in a Women's World Cup qualifying match against the Netherlands.

Since the team was formed, 88 women have represented South Africa in One Day International cricket. This list includes all players who have played at least one ODI match and is initially arranged in the order of debut appearance. Where more than one player won their first cap in the same match, those players are initially listed alphabetically by last name at the time of debut.

Key

Players
Statistics are correct as of 18 July 2022.

ODI captains

Notes

References

 
Women One Day International cricketers
One Day International cricketers
South African